A list of films produced by the Bollywood film industry based in Mumbai in 1985

Top-grossing films
The top-grossing films at the Indian Box Office in 
1985:

1985 A-Z

References

External links
 Bollywood films of 1985 at the Internet Movie Database

1985
Lists of 1985 films by country or language
Films, Bollywood